Rugby Pro D2, also known as Pro D2 is the second tier of rugby union club competition division in France. It is operated by Ligue Nationale de Rugby (LNR) which also runs the division directly above, the first division Top 14. Rugby Pro D2 was introduced in 2000.  It is the world's best supported second tier rugby union league.

Season structure 
There is relegation and promotion between both the Top 14 and Fédérale 1, the third-level competition. The top club at the end of the season is automatically promoted to the Top 14; through the 2016–17 season, the 2nd through 5th place teams play each other for the second promotion place. The bottom two are automatically relegated to Fédérale 1. The bottom two clubs of the Top 14 and the top two of Fédérale 1 then enter the Rugby Pro D2 for the next season.

There are 30 rounds in the regular season, with each team playing each other team home and away. The two halves of the season are played in the same order, with the away team in the first half of the season at home in the second half. The semi-finals and final take place in May, with the second- and third-place teams hosting the semi-finals and the final taking place at a predetermined site. At present, 16 clubs compete in the competition.

All promotions are contingent on passing a postseason financial audit required for all clubs. Also, if a club above the bottom two places fails the audit, it may be relegated in the place of a club that would otherwise have been relegated. This was especially an issue in the 2015–16 season, when four clubs faced at least the prospect of relegation for financial reasons. During the season, Tarbes were dropped to Fédérale 1 effective with the 2016–17 season, and Biarritz, Bourgoin and Narbonne were also dropped at the end of the season, pending appeals. Ultimately, Biarritz, Bourgoin, and Narbonne all won their appeals and remained in Pro D2.

Changes for 2017–18 and beyond 
In August 2016, LNR released a strategic plan outlining its vision for French rugby through the 2023 Rugby World Cup. The plan includes significant changes to the top levels of the league system, with Pro D2 seeing especially dramatic changes starting with the 2017–18 season.
 Starting with 2017–18, Pro D2 will adopt a playoff system identical to that of the Top 14, with the top six teams on the league table qualifying. The top two teams receive byes into the semifinals, where they will face the winners of quarterfinal matches involving the remaining four sides.
 Only the Pro D2 champions will be assured of promotion to the Top 14. The losing finalist will enter a playoff with the second-from-bottom Top 14 side, with the winner taking up the final Top 14 place.

Current teams

2022–23 season

Table

Previous seasons

Number of league titles

Lyon (3)
Auch (2)
Bayonne (2)
Montauban (2)
Oyonnax (2)
Toulon (2)
Perpignan (2)
Agen (1)
Grenoble (1)
Mont-de-Marsan (1)
Montpellier (1)
Pau (1)
Racing Métro (1)

Notes

References

See also
 Ligue Nationale de Rugby
 Rugby union in France

External links
  Rugby Pro D2 – Official website
  Midi Olympique

 
2
Professional sports leagues in France
France